Endospermum is a genus of plants, under the family Euphorbiaceae and the monotypic subtribe Endosperminae first described as a genus in 1861 They are dioecious, rarely monoecious trees. It is native to E + S + SE Asia, Papuasia, Queensland, and certain islands of the W Pacific.

Species

Formerly included 
moved to Macaranga 
Endospermum perakense King ex Hook.f. - Macaranga amissa Airy Shaw

References

Adenoclineae
Euphorbiaceae genera
Dioecious plants